Paris is an unincorporated community located within the towns of Dummer and Stark, New Hampshire, United States. The community is located along New Hampshire Route 110 and north of the Upper Ammonoosuc River, in an area north of West Milan. The majority of the Paris community is located in the western part of the town of Dummer, but it also includes a small portion of Stark around the area of Pike Pond. The Stark portion of Paris is sometimes referred to as "Crystal".

References

Unincorporated communities in New Hampshire
Unincorporated communities in Coös County, New Hampshire